Morinda jasminoides, known as the sweet morinda or jasmine morinda, is a common climber growing in eucalyptus forests and rainforests of eastern Australia. There is a record of this plant in the far north of Western Australia.

Sweet morinda is a small plant in the forest understorey. The orange fruit is edible but unpalatable to humans.

References

 www.plantnet.rbgsyd.nsw.gov.au
 www.survival.org.au

External links

jasminoides
Gentianales of Australia
Flora of New South Wales
Flora of Queensland
Flora of Victoria (Australia)
Eudicots of Western Australia